Styela is a genus of tunicates. Styela clava, an edible species, is known as an invasive species in some areas.

Species include:

 Styela adriatica F. & C. Monniot, 1976 
 Styela aequatorialis Michaelsen, 1915 
 Styela angularis (Stimpson, 1855) 
 Styela aomori Oka, 1935 
 Styela argillacea Sluiter, 1900 
 Styela asterogama Millar, 1975 
 Styela bathybia Bonnevie, 1896 
 Styela brevigaster Millar, 1988 
 Styela calva Monniot C., Monniot F. & Millar, 1976 
 Styela canopus (Savigny, 1816) 
 Styela chaini Monniot C. & Monniot F., 1970 
 Styela changa Monniot & Andrade, 1983 
 Styela charcoti Monniot C. & Monniot F., 1973 
 Styela clava Herdman, 1881
 Styela clavata (Pallas, 1774) 
 Styela complexa Kott, 1995 
 Styela coriacea (Alder & Hancock, 1848) 
 Styela crinita Monniot C. & Monniot F., 1973 
 Styela eurygaster Millar, 1977 
 Styela gagetyleri Young & Vazquez, 1997 
 Styela gelatinosa (Traustedt, 1886) 
 Styela gibbsii Stimpson, 1864 
 Styela glans Herdman, 1881 
 Styela glebosa Sluiter, 1904 
 Styela hadalis Sanamyan & Sanamyan, 2006 
 Styela herdmani Sluiter, 1885 
 Styela izuana (Oka, 1934) 
 Styela kottae Monniot & Monniot, 1991 
 Styela loculosa Monniot C. & Monniot F., 1969 
 Styela longiducta Monniot & Monniot, 1985 
 Styela longipedata Tokioka, 1953 
 Styela longitubis Traustedt & Weltner, 1894 
 Styela macrenteron Ritter, 1913 
 Styela maeandria Sluiter, 1904 
 Styela magalhaensis Michaelsen, 1898 
 Styela mallei Monniot, 1978 
 Styela materna Monniot & Monniot, 1983 
 Styela meteoris Monniot, 2002 
 Styela minima Monniot, 1971 
 Styela monogamica Oka, 1935 
 Styela montereyensis (Dall, 1872) 
 Styela multitentaculata Sanamyan & Sanamyan, 2006 
 Styela natalis Hartmeyer, 1905 
 Styela ordinaria Monniot & Monniot, 1985 
 Styela paessleri (Michaelsen, 1898) 
 Styela perforata Sluiter, 1890 
 Styela pfefferi Michaelsen, 1898 
 Styela plicata (Lesueur, 1823) 
 Styela polypes Monniot, Monniot & Millar, 1976 
 Styela profunda Sluiter, 1904 
 Styela psammodes Sluiter, 1904 
 Styela psoliformis Monniot & Monniot, 1989 
 Styela rustica Linnaeus, 1767 
 Styela schmitti Van Name, 1945 
 Styela sericata Herdman, 1888 
 Styela sigma Hartmeyer, 1912 
 Styela similis Monniot C., 1970 
 Styela squamosa Herdman, 1881 
 Styela subpinguis Herdman, 1923 
 Styela suluensis Monniot & Monniot, 2003 
 Styela talpina Monniot, 1978 
 Styela tenuibranchia Monniot, Monniot & Millar, 1976 
 Styela tesseris Lambert, 1993 
 Styela thalassae Monniot C., 1969 
 Styela theeli Ärnbäck, 1922 
 Styela tholiformis (Sluiter, 1912) 
 Styela tokiokai Nishikawa, 1991 
 Styela truncata Ritter, 1901 
 Styela uniplicata Bonnevie, 1896 
 Styela wandeli (Sluiter, 1911) 
 Styela yakutatensis Ritter, 1901 

Species names currently considered to be synonyms:

 Styela aggregata Traustedt, 1880: synonym of Styela coriacea (Alder & Hancock, 1848) 
 Styela albomarginata Sluiter, 1904: synonym of Polycarpa obscura Heller, 1878 
 Styela ambonensis Sluiter, 1904: synonym of Polycarpa ambonensis (Sluiter, 1904) 
 Styela anguinea Sluiter, 1898: synonym of Polycarpa anguinea (Sluiter, 1898) 
 Styela apalina Alder & Hancock, 1907: synonym of Polycarpa pomaria (Savigny, 1816) 
 Styela appropinquata Sluiter, 1898: synonym of Polycarpa appropinquata (Sluiter, 1898) 
 Styela arctica Swederus, 1887: synonym of Dendrodoa aggregata Müller, 1776 
 Styela areolata Heller, 1878: synonym of Cnemidocarpa areolata (Heller, 1878) 
 Styela argentata Sluiter, 1890: synonym of Polycarpa argentata (Sluiter, 1890) 
 Styela armata Lacaze-Duthiers & Delage, 1892: synonym of Styela coriacea (Alder & Hancock, 1848) 
 Styela ascidioides Herdman, 1906: synonym of Polycarpa olitoria (Sluiter, 1890) 
 Styela asiphonica Sluiter, 1898: synonym of Polycarpa insulsa (Sluiter, 1898) 
 Styela asymmetra (Hartmeyer, 1912): synonym of Asterocarpa humilis (Heller, 1878) 
 Styela atlantica (Van Name, 1912): synonym of Styela sigma Hartmeyer, 1912 
 Styela aurata (Quoy & Gaimard, 1834): synonym of Polycarpa aurata (Quoy & Gaimard, 1834) 
 Styela aurita Sluiter, 1890: synonym of Polycarpa aurita (Sluiter, 1890) 
 Styela barbaris Kott, 1952: synonym of Styela canopus (Savigny, 1816) 
 Styela barnharti Ritter & Forsyth, 1917: synonym of Styela clava Herdman, 1881
 Styela bathyphila (Millar, 1955): synonym of Cnemidocarpa bathyphila Millar, 1955 
 Styela bermudensis Van Name, 1902: synonym of Styela canopus (Savigny, 1816) 
 Styela bicolor (Sluiter, 1887): synonym of Styela canopus (Savigny, 1816) 
 Styela bicornuta Sluiter, 1900: synonym of Cnemidocarpa bicornuta (Sluiter, 1900) 
 Styela biforis Sluiter, 1904: synonym of Polycarpa biforis (Sluiter, 1904) 
 Styela brevipedunculata Sluiter, 1898: synonym of Polycarpa spongiabilis Traustedt, 1883 
 Styela bythia Herdman, 1881: synonym of Cnemidocarpa bythia (Herdman, 1881) 
 Styela canopoides Heller, 1877: synonym of Styela canopus (Savigny, 1816) 
 Styela captiosa Sluiter, 1885: synonym of Polycarpa papillata Sluiter, 1885 
 Styela cartilaginea Sluiter, 1898: synonym of Polycarpa cartilaginea (Sluiter, 1898) 
 Styela cerea Sluiter, 1900: synonym of Asterocarpa humilis (Heller, 1878) 
 Styela circumarata Sluiter, 1904: synonym of Polycarpa aurita (Sluiter, 1890) 
 Styela clara Hartmeyer, 1906: synonym of Cnemidocarpa clara (Hartmeyer, 1906) 
 Styela coerulea (Quoy & Gaimard, 1834): synonym of Asterocarpa coerulea (Quoy & Gaimard, 1834) 
 Styela comata (Alder, 1863): synonym of Polycarpa comata (Alder, 1863) 
 Styela conica Swederus, 1887: synonym of Styela coriacea (Alder & Hancock, 1848) 
 Styela contecta Sluiter, 1904: synonym of Polycarpa contecta (Sluiter, 1904) 
 Styela convexa Herdman, 1881: synonym of Cnemidocarpa drygalskii (Hartmeyer, 1911) 
 Styela costata (Hartmeyer, 1911): synonym of Styela angularis (Stimpson, 1855) 
 Styela cryptocarpa Sluiter, 1885: synonym of Polycarpa obscura Heller, 1878 
 Styela curtzei Michaelsen, 1900: synonym of Cnemidocarpa nordenskjöldi (Michaelsen, 1898) 
 Styela cylindrica Bonnevie, 1896: synonym of Styela coriacea (Alder & Hancock, 1848) 
 Styela cylindriformis Bonnevie, 1896: synonym of Styela coriacea (Alder & Hancock, 1848) 
 Styela depressa Alder & Hancock, 1907: synonym of Polycarpa tenera Lacaze-Duthiers & Delage, 1892 
 Styela doliolum Bjerkan, 1905: synonym of Styela gelatinosa (Traustedt, 1886) 
 Styela drygalskii (Hartmeyer, 1911): synonym of Cnemidocarpa drygalskii (Hartmeyer, 1911) 
 Styela elata (Heller, 1878): synonym of Polycarpa papillata Sluiter, 1885 
 Styela elsa Hartmeyer, 1906: synonym of Cnemidocarpa clara (Hartmeyer, 1906) 
 Styela esther Hartmeyer, 1906: synonym of Cnemidocarpa irene (Hartmeyer, 1906) 
 Styela etheridgii Herdman, 1899: synonym of Cnemidocarpa radicosa (Herdman, 1882) 
 Styela fertilis Hartmeyer, 1906: synonym of Cnemidocarpa fertilis (Hartmeyer, 1906) 
 Styela fibrillata Alder & Hancock, 1907: synonym of Polycarpa comata (Alder, 1863) 
 Styela finmarkiensis (Kiaer, 1893): synonym of Cnemidocarpa finmarkiensis (Kiaer, 1893) 
 Styela flava Herdman, 1881: synonym of Styela squamosa Herdman, 1881 
 Styela flexibilis Sluiter, 1905: synonym of Cnemidocarpa verrucosa (Lesson, 1830) 
 Styela floccosa Sluiter, 1904: synonym of Cnemidocarpa floccosa (Sluiter, 1904) 
 Styela friabilis Sluiter, 1898: synonym of Polycarpa spongiabilis Traustedt, 1883 
 Styela fuliginea Sluiter, 1898: synonym of Polycarpa spongiabilis Traustedt, 1883 
 Styela gracilocarpa Millar, 1982: synonym of Styela squamosa Herdman, 1881 
 Styela grahami Sluiter, 1905: synonym of Dicarpa insinuosa (Sluiter, 1912) 
 Styela grandis Herdman, 1881: synonym of Cnemidocarpa verrucosa (Lesson, 1830) 
 Styela granulata (Alder, 1863): synonym of Polycarpa pomaria (Savigny, 1816) 
 Styela greeleyi (Ritter, 1899): synonym of Styela clavata (Pallas, 1774) 
 Styela grossularia (Beneden, 1846): synonym of Dendrodoa grossularia (Van Beneden, 1846) 
 Styela gyrosa Heller, 1877: synonym of Styela plicata (Lesueur, 1823) 
 Styela hemicaespitosa Ritter, 1913: synonym of Styela coriacea (Alder & Hancock, 1848) 
 Styela humilis Heller, 1878: synonym of Asterocarpa humilis (Heller, 1878) 
 Styela hupferi (Michaelsen, 1904): synonym of Distomus hupferi (Michaelsen, 1904) 
 Styela incubita Sluiter, 1904: synonym of Cnemidocarpa incubita (Sluiter, 1904) 
 Styela informis Forbes, 1848: synonym of Polycarpa pomaria (Savigny, 1816) 
 Styela insinuosa (Sluiter, 1912): synonym of Dicarpa insinuosa (Sluiter, 1912) 
 Styela insulsa Sluiter, 1898: synonym of Polycarpa insulsa (Sluiter, 1898) 
 Styela irene Hartmeyer, 1906: synonym of Cnemidocarpa irene (Hartmeyer, 1906) 
 Styela irma (Hartmeyer, 1927): synonym of Cnemidocarpa irene (Hartmeyer, 1906) 
 Styela joannae Herdman, 1898: synonym of Cnemidocarpa clara (Hartmeyer, 1906) 
 Styela kroboja Oka, 1906: synonym of Polycarpa obscura Heller, 1878 
 Styela lactea Herdman, 1881: synonym of Cnemidocarpa verrucosa (Lesson, 1830) 
 Styela lapidosa (Herdman, 1891): synonym of Polyandrocarpa lapidosa (Herdman, 1891) 
 Styela lineata Traustedt, 1880: synonym of Dendrodoa lineata (Traustedt, 1880) 
 Styela lobata Kott, 1952: synonym of Cnemidocarpa lobata (Kott, 1952) 
 Styela longata Kott, 1954: synonym of Cnemidocarpa longata (Kott, 1954) 
 Styela loveni (Sars, 1851): synonym of Styela coriacea (Alder & Hancock, 1848) 
 Styela lovenii (Sars, 1851): synonym of Styela coriacea (Alder & Hancock, 1848) 
 Styela macrogastra Oka, 1935: synonym of Styela coriacea (Alder & Hancock, 1848) 
 Styela maculata Sanamyan, 1992: synonym of Styela squamosa Herdman, 1881 
 Styela maendria Sluiter, 1904: synonym of Styela maendria Sluiter, 1904 
 Styela maendria Sluiter, 1904: synonym of Styela maeandria Sluiter, 1904 
 Styela mammiculata Carlisle, 1954: synonym of Styela clava Herdman, 1881 
 Styela maroccana Sluiter, 1927: synonym of Cnemidocarpa irene (Hartmeyer, 1906) 
 Styela marquesana Michaelsen, 1918: synonym of Styela canopus (Savigny, 1816) 
 Styela melincae Ärnbäck, 1929: synonym of Styela magalhaensis Michaelsen, 1898 
 Styela milleri Ritter, 1907: synonym of Styela squamosa Herdman, 1881 
 Styela miniata Sluiter, 1905: synonym of Eusynstyela miniata (Sluiter, 1905) 
 Styela mollis (Stimpson, 1852): synonym of Cnemidocarpa mollis (Stimpson, 1852) 
 Styela monoceros (Moeller, 1842): synonym of Styela rustica Linnaeus, 1767 
 Styela natalensis Sluiter, 1898: synonym of Polycarpa natalensis (Sluiter, 1898) 
 Styela nidrosiensis Ärnbäck, 1926: synonym of Styela coriacea (Alder & Hancock, 1848) 
 Styela nisiotis Sluiter, 1900: synonym of Cnemidocarpa nisiotis (Sluiter, 1900) 
 Styela nivosa Sluiter, 1898: synonym of Polycarpa anguinea (Sluiter, 1898) 
 Styela nordenskjöldi Michaelsen, 1898: synonym of Cnemidocarpa nordenskjöldi (Michaelsen, 1898) 
 Styela northumbrica Alder & Hancock, 1907: synonym of Styela coriacea (Alder & Hancock, 1848) 
 Styela nutrix Sluiter, 1904: synonym of Polycarpa argentata (Sluiter, 1890) 
 Styela oblonga Herdman, 1881: synonym of Styela squamosa Herdman, 1881 
 Styela obscura Alder & Hancock, 1907: synonym of Polycarpa tenera Lacaze-Duthiers & Delage, 1892 
 Styela obtecta (Traustedt, 1883): synonym of Polycarpa spongiabilis Traustedt, 1883 
 Styela ohlini Michaelsen, 1898: synonym of Cnemidocarpa ohlini (Michaelsen, 1898) 
 Styela oligocarpa Sluiter, 1885: synonym of Cnemidocarpa oligocarpa (Sluiter, 1885) 
 Styela olitoria Sluiter, 1890: synonym of Polycarpa olitoria (Sluiter, 1890) 
 Styela opalina Alder, 1863: synonym of Polycarpa pomaria (Savigny, 1816) 
 Styela orbicularis Sluiter, 1904: synonym of Styela canopus (Savigny, 1816) 
 Styela palinorsa Sluiter, 1895: synonym of Polycarpa palinorsa (Sluiter, 1895) 
 Styela papillata Kott, 1954: synonym of Polycarpa papillata Sluiter, 1885 
 Styela papillata Sluiter, 1885: synonym of Polycarpa papillata Sluiter, 1885 
 Styela partita (Stimpson, 1852): synonym of Styela canopus (Savigny, 1816)
 Styela partito (Stimpson, 1852): synonym of Styela canopus (Savigny, 1816) 
 Styela patens Sluiter, 1885: synonym of Polycarpa patens (Sluiter, 1885) 
 Styela pavementis Kott, 1952: synonym of Cnemidocarpa irene (Hartmeyer, 1906) 
 Styela pedata (Herdman, 1881): synonym of Cnemidocarpa pedata (Herdman, 1881) 
 Styela personata Herdman, 1899: synonym of Cnemidocarpa personata (Herdman, 1899) 
 Styela phaula Sluiter, 1895: synonym of Polycarpa papillata Sluiter, 1885 
 Styela pigmentata Herdman, 1906: synonym of Polycarpa pigmentata (Herdman, 1906) 
 Styela pinguis Herdman, 1899: synonym of Styela plicata (Lesueur, 1823) 
 Styela plata Oka, 1930: synonym of Styela coriacea (Alder & Hancock, 1848) 
 Styela pneumonodes Sluiter, 1895: synonym of Polycarpa aurata (Quoy & Gaimard, 1834) 
 Styela procera Sluiter, 1885: synonym of Polycarpa procera (Sluiter, 1885) 
 Styela prolifera Sluiter, 1905: synonym of Stolonica prolifera Sluiter, 1905 
 Styela psoloessa Sluiter, 1890: synonym of Polycarpa aurata (Quoy & Gaimard, 1834) 
 Styela pupa Heller, 1878: synonym of Styela canopus (Savigny, 1816) 
 Styela pustulosa Sluiter, 1904: synonym of Polycarpa pustulosa (Sluiter, 1904) 
 Styela quadrangularis Forbes, 1848: synonym of Polycarpa pomaria (Savigny, 1816) 
 Styela quadrata (Herdman, 1882): synonym of Polycarpa quadrata Herdman, 1881 
 Styela quidni (Sluiter, 1912): synonym of Styela wandeli (Sluiter, 1911) 
 Styela radicata Millar, 1962: synonym of Cnemidocarpa radicata (Millar, 1962) 
 Styela radicosa Herdman, 1882: synonym of Cnemidocarpa radicosa (Herdman, 1882) 
 Styela ramificata Kott, 1952: synonym of Polycarpa aurita (Sluiter, 1890) 
 Styela rectangularis Kott, 1952: synonym of Styela canopus (Savigny, 1816) 
 Styela reducta Sluiter, 1904: synonym of Stolonica reducta (Sluiter, 1904) 
 Styela reniformis Sluiter, 1904: synonym of Polycarpa reniformis (Sluiter, 1904) 
 Styela rhizopus Redikorzev, 1907: synonym of Cnemidocarpa rhizopus (Redikorzev, 1907) 
 Styela robusta Sluiter, 1904: synonym of Polycarpa aurita (Sluiter, 1890) 
 Styela rotunda Herdman, 1910: synonym of Cnemidocarpa drygalskii (Hartmeyer, 1911) 
 Styela rubida Sluiter, 1898: synonym of Polycarpa rubida (Sluiter, 1898) 
 Styela rubra (Fewkes, 1889): synonym of Styela montereyensis (Dall, 1872) 
 Styela sabulifera Ritter, 1913: synonym of Cnemidocarpa rhizopus (Redikorzev, 1907) 
 Styela salebrosa Beniaminson, 1971: synonym of Styela coriacea (Alder & Hancock, 1848) 
 Styela sedata Sluiter, 1904: synonym of Cnemidocarpa sedata (Sluiter, 1904) 
 Styela seminuda Sluiter, 1898: synonym of Polycarpa spongiabilis Traustedt, 1883 
 Styela serpentina (Sluiter, 1912): synonym of Cnemidocarpa pfefferi (Michaelsen, 1898) 
 Styela sobria Sluiter, 1904: synonym of Polycarpa sobria (Sluiter, 1904) 
 Styela solvens Sluiter, 1895: synonym of Polycarpa olitoria (Sluiter, 1890) 
 Styela spectabilis Herdman, 1910: synonym of Cnemidocarpa verrucosa (Lesson, 1830) 
 Styela spiralis Sluiter, 1885: synonym of Polycarpa spiralis (Sluiter, 1885) 
 Styela spirifera (Herdman, 1899): synonym of Cnemidocarpa verrucosa (Lesson, 1830) 
 Styela steineni Michaelsen, 1898: synonym of Cnemidocarpa verrucosa (Lesson, 1830) 
 Styela stephensoni Michaelsen, 1934: synonym of Styela canopus (Savigny, 1816) 
 Styela stimpsoni Ritter, 1900: synonym of Cnemidocarpa finmarkiensis (Kiaer, 1893) 
 Styela stolonifera Herdman, 1899: synonym of Cnemidocarpa stolonifera (Herdman, 1899) 
 Styela sulcatula (Alder, 1863): synonym of Polycarpa pomaria (Savigny, 1816) 
 Styela thelyphanes Sluiter, 1904: synonym of Polycarpa thelyphanes (Sluiter, 1904) 
 Styela tinaktae Van Name, 1918: synonym of Cnemidocarpa tinaktae (Van Name, 1918) 
 Styela traustedti Sluiter, 1890: synonym of Cnemidocarpa traustedti (Sluiter, 1890) 
 Styela tuberosa (MacGillivray, 1844): synonym of Polycarpa pomaria (Savigny, 1816) 
 Styela variabilis Hancock, 1868: synonym of Styela canopus (Savigny, 1816) 
 Styela verrucosa (Lesson, 1830): synonym of Cnemidocarpa verrucosa (Lesson, 1830) 
 Styela vestita (Alder, 1860): synonym of Cnemidocarpa mollis (Stimpson, 1852) 
 Styela violacea (Alder, 1863): synonym of Polycarpa violacea (Alder, 1863) 
 Styela whiteleggei (Herdman, 1899): synonym of Cnemidocarpa pedata (Herdman, 1881) 
 Styela whiteleggii Herdman, 1899: synonym of Cnemidocarpa pedata (Herdman, 1881)

References

Stolidobranchia
Tunicate genera